

Salo Siegfried Translateur, or Siegfried "Salo" Translateur,  (19 June 1875 – 1 March 1944) was a German conductor and composer of waltzes, marches, and other light dance music. Today he is most famous for his  waltz, which became popular as Sportpalastwalzer in 1920s Berlin.

Biography 
Siegfried Translateur was born in Carlsruhe in Upper Silesia, in the Province of Silesia, Kingdom of Prussia, German Empire (Pokój in Poland), the natural son of Rosaline Translateur (1858 in  Lublin, Lublin Governorate, Congress Poland, Russian Empire  1934, Moravský Krumlov) and an unknown father, and adopted child of her later husband, the ḥazzān Salomon Lagodzinsky (1857, [?]  1915). He started his music studies in Breslau, Vienna, and Leipzig, and also learned from a French composer of dance music, Émile Waldteufel. In 1900, he moved to Berlin, where he became an orchestra conductor.

Translateur's entertainment music became increasingly popular; his orchestra played on international tours and even in the presence of Emperor Wilhelm II. In 1911, he founded the "Lyra" music publishing company in Berlin-Wilmersdorf. It mostly published his own works, but also compositions by José Armándola, Marc Roland, Franz von Blon and Paul Lincke, among others. Translateur's son Hans Translateur later joined his father in the business, and the publishing house was renamed to "Lyra Translateur & Co".

After the Nazi seizure of power in 1933, Translateur, having been deemed a "half-Jew" (Mischling) by the Nuremberg Laws, was forced to liquidate "Lyra", and was barred from the Reich Music Chamber which meant a professional ban. He sold his publishing house to the London publisher Bosworth in 1938. Not much is known about what happened to him after that. Translateur, along with his wife, was deported from Berlin to the Theresienstadt concentration camp on 19 April 1943. He died there on 1 March 1944, at the age of sixty-eight.

Works 
Author of about 200 works, Translateur's most famous piece remains the Wiener Praterleben waltz (opus 12), which he wrote in 1892 at the age of seventeen while attending the Vienna conservatory. It became widely known as the Sportpalastwalzer ("Sports Palace Waltz"), because it has been played regularly during the "Six-days" cycle races at the Berlin Sportpalast from 1923 onwards. Up to today, it is played at the current Velodrom track cycling arena.

Many of his works were titled in reference to a current event, such as the German warrior quadrille for piano, opus 45, and Automotive march for orchestra, Op 154.

References

External links 
 

1875 births
1944 deaths
19th-century German composers
20th-century German composers
19th-century Prussian people
German male conductors (music)
Jewish composers
German male composers
German people who died in the Theresienstadt Ghetto
Silesian Jews
People from the Province of Silesia
People of the German Empire
People from Namysłów County
Musicians from Berlin
20th-century German conductors (music)
20th-century German male musicians
19th-century German male musicians